Jingxing County is a county of Hebei Province, North China, it is under the administration of the prefecture-level city of Shijiazhuang, the capital of the province.

When King Mu of Zhou went hunting in the region, he described the terrain as "the surrounding is high while the center is deep, like a well, [making the region] resemble the border of a stove", hence the name of the county.

According to archeological discoveries, there were inhabitants settled in Dongyuan Village (東元村) during the stone age.

Administrative divisions
There are 10 towns and 7 townships under the county's administration.

Towns:
Weishui, Shang'an, Tianchang, Xiulin, Nanyu, Weizhou, Xiaozuo, Nanzhangcheng, Cangyanshan, Ceyu

Townships:
Wujiayao Township, Beizheng Township, Yujia Township, Sunzhuang Township, Nanxing Township, Xinzhuang Township, Nanwangzhuang Township

Climate

Films
The 2018 film An Elephant Sitting Still was filmed in Jingxing County.

References

External links
Official website of Jingxing County Government

County-level divisions of Hebei
Shijiazhuang